The 1994 U.S. Figure Skating Championships were held at the Joe Louis Arena in Detroit, Michigan. Medals were awarded in four colors: gold (first), silver (second), bronze (third), and pewter (fourth) in four disciplines – men's singles, ladies' singles, pair skating, and ice dancing – across three levels: senior, junior, and novice. The event was used to determine the U.S. teams for the 1994 Winter Olympics and the 1994 World Championships.

The competition was famous for the return of previous Olympians Brian Boitano and Elaine Zayak, as well as the pre-competition attack on Nancy Kerrigan by associates of skater Tonya Harding. Harding subsequently was stripped of her ladies' championship title after she pleaded guilty to failing to report the assault to the police after the fact, although she maintains that she had no knowledge of the attack beforehand.

Medalists

Senior

 In June 1994, U.S. Figure Skating voted to no longer recognize Tonya Harding's 1994 win. The gold medal position was left vacant; the other competitors did not move up one position.

Junior

Novice

Senior results

Men

Ladies

Pairs

Ice dancing

Junior results

Men

Ladies

Pairs

Ice dancing

Reinstatement of professionals to amateur status

Amateurs who turned professional had been banned from returning to compete as amateurs. This ban was removed and Brian Boitano and Elaine Zayak sought to compete in order to go to the 1994 Winter Olympics.

Having retired from competitive skating after winning Olympic gold in 1988 and the 1988 World Championships, four time men's champion Brian Boitano announced a comeback and would compete to get a place on the 1994 Olympic team. This was highly controversial as he had skated professionally for many years and fought to get former professionals reinstated for amateur competitions. He placed second behind Scott Davis and made the Olympic team as the United States had 2 spots.

Kerrigan–Harding controversy

The January 6, 1994, attack on 1993 champion and Ladies gold frontrunner Nancy Kerrigan preceded the event. The widely publicized attack took place during a practice session for the 1994 U.S. Figure Skating Championships in Detroit. Tonya Harding's ex-husband, Jeff Gillooly, and her bodyguard, Shawn Eckardt, hired Shane Stant to strike Kerrigan on the knee, though Stant actually struck Kerrigan's thigh a few inches above the knee. Kerrigan's injury forced her withdrawal, and Harding won the event.

After Harding admitted to helping to cover up the attack, the USFSA and United States Olympic Committee initiated proceedings to remove her from the 1994 Olympic team, but Harding retained her place after threatening legal action. She finished eighth in the 1994 Winter Olympics in Lillehammer, Norway, while Kerrigan, who recovered from her injuries, finished second.

Collision
During a warm-up, ice dancer Renée Roca was skating backward and collided with the team of Galit Chait and Maksim Sevostyanov, fracturing a bone in her left arm. Two hours later, she returned from the hospital with her arm in a cast and decided to try to compete. She and partner Gorsha Sur placed second in the rhumba, however, Roca was unable to secure a firm grip with her left hand, and had to withdraw from the rest of the competition.

References

External links
 men's and ladies' results

U.S. Figure Skating Championships
Sports competitions in Detroit
United States Figure Skating Championships, 1994
United States Figure Skating Championships, 1994
January 1994 sports events in the United States
1994 in sports in Michigan
1994 in Detroit